Guillermo Arduino (born 1964) is a CNN anchor and correspondent. Currently he is the host of Encuentro on CNN en Español and Clix, a tech show on CNN en Español.

Early life and career
Arduino was born in 1964 and raised in Buenos Aires, Argentina. He attended the Instituto Superior de Enseñanza de Radiodifusión, Instituto Nacional Superior del Profesorado en Lenguas Vivas "Juan Ramón Fernandez". He began working in the radio and television industry at the age of twenty-five, eventually becoming the host of a nightly news program in Argentina on CVN-America TV.

Career in the United States
In 1995 he worked as a news anchor for a breakfast show on NBC's International Language TV News Station Canal de Noticias. At NBC he interviewed world leaders and covered US Presidential elections. Starting in 1997 Arduino worked as an on-air meteorologist and show presenter for The Weather Channel. He then became a member of CNN's weather team as an international weather anchor. In 2002 he became an anchor for CNN World View and served as anchor during the Iraq War and the War in Afghanistan.

Since 2008, Arduino has been the host of Clix, a weekly tech show on CNN en Español and CNN Latino. In December 2011 Arduino left the weather team of CNN International to assume his new role as CNN anchor and correspondent. Since then he has become the host and anchor of the weekend news show Mirador Mundial. At CNN International he has also hosted Global Challenges and is the anchor of the CNN en Español technology news show Clix. He was nominated for the 2014 Daytime Emmy Award in 2016. In 2015 he was named an Embajador de la Creatividad by the University of Palermo in Buenos Aires.

References

CNN people
Argentine television journalists
Television meteorologists
People from Buenos Aires
Argentine people of Italian descent
Living people
1964 births